Jaleshwar Mahadev Temple (Nepali: जलेश्वर महादेव मन्दिर) is a hindu temple of Shiva situated at Mahottari district, Nepal.
Pilgrims visit this temple on Maha Shivaratri and Vasant Panchami. The city of Jaleshwar where this temple is located is named after this temple.

Records indicates that the temple was in existence from the time of King Janak. It is believed that during the marriage between Rama and Sita, soils were taken from this temple.

The temple is constructed with Gumbaja architecture. In the middle of the main temple, there is a square Shiva Linga which lies below water. There is a pond near the temple.

Gallery

See also
List of Hindu temples in Nepal

References

Buildings and structures in Mahottari District
7th-century establishments in Nepal